The Snapper Point Power Station is a gas turbine power station under development at Outer Harbor, South Australia, beside the older Pelican Point Power Station.

Snapper Point Power Station is owned by Nexif Energy and is a peaking power plant to provide firm reliability for electricity supply contracts from Nexif's Lincoln Gap Wind Farm. It uses the five gas turbine generation units acquired from the Government of South Australia which previously comprised the Temporary Generation North power station. The plant is expected to be online by 1 July 2023.

References

Buildings and structures completed in 2022
Natural gas-fired power stations in South Australia